Stanley Vincent Miarka (February 8, 1932 – May 28, 2001) was one of the five white professional baseball players to be the first to join the Negro American League. He was signed to the Chicago American Giants in 1950 by Ted "Double Duty" Radcliffe with the support of the team's owner, Dr. J.B. Martin, who was concerned about black players joining Major League teams. The other four young white players were Lou Chirban, Lou Clarizio, Al Dubetts and Frank Dyall.

He had a brief Minor League career, playing 27 games at third base for two teams in 1953.

See also
 List of Negro league baseball players

References

Chicago American Giants players
2001 deaths
1932 births
20th-century African-American sportspeople
St. Ignatius College Prep alumni
Loyola University Chicago alumni